Pulse 87 is an online radio station with an EDM music format. It started out as the audio feed of a channel-6 “Franken-FM” television station in New York City, audible on traditional FM radios at 87.7, before moving solely to streaming online.

History
The brand was formerly owned and operated by Mega Media, which they operated under a leasing deal with WNYZ-LP, Broadcasting at 87.7 (channel 6), with plans to expand the format to other cities only to incur financial losses and disputes over their business arrangements, leading up to the station's demise in 2009. In February 2010, the format was resurrected as an online non-profit internet station under new management following the bankruptcy and liquidation of its former owner.

Return to terrestrial radio
On June 24, 2014, LKCM Broadcasting, the owners of KYLI in Las Vegas, adopted the "Pulse 87" brand, replacing the interactive Jelli format it has used since 2011. This brought the Pulse brand back to radio for the first time since its 2009 demise. The Pulse 87 brand continued online. KYLI was sold off in August 2016 and changed formats the following October.

On October 24, 2014, Metro Radio announced that its FM translator, W249BE Alexandria, Virginia, would become the second station to adopt the Pulse 87 brand. The station, which simulcasts Spanish AC WTNT, covers the Washington metropolitan area. The move marked the first time since 2009, when it attempted to bring the format to the market as the proposed format for WDCN-LP until it was cancelled at the last minute by the station's owners. However, the plans for W249BE fell through after it was announced.

On January 8, 2018, Entercom (now called Audacy Inc.) entered a deal to bring Pulse 87 to the Los Angeles airwaves as a HD2 subchannel of Top 40/CHR KAMP-FM, billing it as “Pulse 97.1 HD2.” The deal was later expanded to Entercom's Radio.com platform the following March.

As of October 2018, KAMP-HD2 is no longer a simulcast of Pulse 87.

References

External links
 (Pulse 87 primary website)
 (Pulse 87 on air at Radio.com)

Internet radio stations in the United States
Dance radio stations
Radio stations established in 2008